Çatakbaşı is a village in the Kovancılar District of Elazığ Province in Turkey. Its population is 103 (2021). The village is populated by Kurds.

References

Villages in Kovancılar District
Kurdish settlements in Elazığ Province